Wilhelmus Lourens Johannes Suurbier (16 January 1945 – 12 July 2020) was a Dutch professional footballer and among others assistant coach of the Albania national team. He played as a right back and was part of the Netherlands national team and AFC Ajax teams of the 1970s.

Club career
Suurbier was born in Eindhoven. He made his debut for Ajax Amsterdam when he was 19 and played with them for 13 years, all throughout the most successful era until 1977 when he was 32 years old. Usually a right back, Suurbier was renowned for his pace and stamina. Suurbier was a big part of the 70's "total football" team the "Twelve Apostles" of Ajax Amsterdam led by Johan Cruijff, which lifted the UEFA European Cup three times in a row. In 1977, he moved to FC Schalke 04 for one season.

In 1979, Suurbier transferred to the Los Angeles Aztecs of the North American Soccer League. He played three seasons in Los Angeles before moving to the San Jose Earthquakes for the 1982 season. In the fall of 1982, the team was renamed the Golden Bay Earthquakes and entered the Major Indoor Soccer League. He retired at the end of the season to become an assistant coach with the Earthquakes. He later resumed his playing career as a player-coach of the Tampa Bay Rowdies in the American Indoor Soccer Association.

International career
Suurbier played 60 matches and scored three goals for the Netherlands national team from 1966 to 1978. He played in both the 1974 and 1978 World Cups where the Dutch finished second, and also the 1976 UEFA European Football Championship.

Managerial career
In 1983, Suurbier was an assistant coach with the Golden Bay Earthquakes. In 1984, the Tulsa Roughnecks of the North American Soccer League hired Suurbier as head coach. He took the team to a 10–14 record. In 1986, he became the head coach of the Los Angeles Heat of the Western Soccer League. In the fall of 1986, he was hired by the Tampa Bay Rowdies as the team entered the American Indoor Soccer Association. In November 1987, Suurbier became the head coach of the newly established Fort Lauderdale Strikers in preparation of the team's first season in 1988. That season, the Strikers finished and went to the American Soccer League championship before falling to the Washington Diplomats. In January 1989, Suurbier resigned as coach of the Strikers. In February 1989, he was named the new head coach of the Miami Sharks. After starting the season at 2–3, the Sharks fired Suurbier. In 1994, he became the head coach of the St. Petersburg Kickers. In 1999 Suurbier joined Al Etehad (Qatar) as an assistant coach to Rene Meulensteen. Together they won the Arab Cup and H.H. Apparent Cup that season. The year after they joined Al Sadd (Qatar) and in season 2000–01 they won the Emir cup. From 2001–02 Suurbier worked for Heerenveen as an assistant for the U-20 squad. In 2017, he was a part of the coaching staff for the pre-season preparations of the Indian Super League club Kerala Blasters in Spain, where he served as a mentor to the Blasters' head coach René Meulensteen during the preseason.

Personal life
In May 2020, it was reported that Suurbier was in intensive care after having suffered a "major" intracerebral haemorrhage. He died on 12 July 2020.

Honours
Ajax
 Eredivisie (7): 1965–66, 1966–67, 1967–68, 1969–70, 1971–72, 1972–73, 1976–77
 KNVB Cup: 1967, 1970, 1971, 1972
 European Cup: 1971, 1972, 1973
 European Super Cup: 1972, 1973
 Intercontinental Cup: 1972

Netherlands
 FIFA World Cup runner-up: 1974, 1978
 UEFA European Championship third place: 1976

References

External links

`Suurbier Appreciated`
1974 FIFA World Cup final appearance
1978 FIFA World Cup final appearance
1976 Euro 3rd Place winners
NASL/MISL stats
Profile – FC Metz

1945 births
2020 deaths
Footballers from Eindhoven
Dutch footballers
Association football fullbacks
Netherlands international footballers
UEFA Champions League winning players
1974 FIFA World Cup players
UEFA Euro 1976 players
1978 FIFA World Cup players
Eredivisie players
Bundesliga players
Ligue 1 players
Hong Kong First Division League players
Major Indoor Soccer League (1978–1992) players
North American Soccer League (1968–1984) players
American Indoor Soccer Association players
AFC Ajax players
FC Schalke 04 players
FC Metz players
Los Angeles Aztecs players
Sparta Rotterdam players
San Jose Earthquakes (1974–1988) players
Golden Bay Earthquakes (MISL) players
Tampa Bay Rowdies (1975–1993) players
Dutch football managers
American Soccer League (1988–89) coaches
American Indoor Soccer Association coaches
North American Soccer League (1968–1984) coaches
Tampa Bay Rowdies coaches
Western Soccer Alliance coaches
Kerala Blasters FC non-playing staff
Dutch expatriate footballers
Dutch expatriate football managers
Dutch expatriate sportspeople in West Germany
Expatriate footballers in West Germany
Dutch expatriate sportspeople in France
Expatriate footballers in France
Dutch expatriate sportspeople in the United States
Expatriate soccer players in the United States
Expatriate footballers in Hong Kong
Dutch expatriate sportspeople in Hong Kong
Expatriate soccer managers in the United States